Andrew William Thomas (born October 8, 1939) is an American composer.

He studied with Karel Husa at Cornell University, with Nadia Boulanger in Paris, and earned his M.M. and D.M.A. Degrees in Composition at The Juilliard School.  At Juilliard he studied with Luciano Berio, Elliott Carter, and Otto Luening.

Thomas teaches and was the chairman of the Composition Department at the Pre-College Division at Juilliard from 1969 to 1994. In 1994, the Juilliard School appointed him the Director of the Pre-College Division.  In addition to composing, Dr. Thomas performs as a pianist, conductor, and is a guest teacher throughout the world.  His many awards include a grant from The National Endowment for the Arts and a Distinguished Teacher Citation from The White House Commission on Presidential Scholars.

Career
Although he has taught throughout the world, since 2000, Andrew Thomas has become a regular guest of the People's Republic of China. Under the auspices of the Chinese Government, Dr. Thomas performed his composition for solo piano, Music at Twilight in Hong Kong and Guangzhou.  He was the head western judge of a panel of pianists from all over the world judging the 2000 Chinese Works Piano Competition.

In December 2001, Dr. Thomas went to Nanning, China to conduct his Three Scenes from the Summer Palace and other works, to perform as a pianist, and to teach master classes in composition. Dr. Thomas is now an Advisor of the Guangxi Arts College and a guest conductor of the Guangxi Arts College Youth Orchestra. He has returned yearly for further conducting and solo performances. He was honored as the main Western speaker at a conference of middle school administrators and government officials from all parts of China.

In an effort to upgrade music education throughout China, Dr. Thomas developed a program which brought together music academies in an effort to advance all the students’ technical and artistic abilities in Western as well as Asian music. In April 2004 he conducted the Shanghai Conservatory Youth Orchestra and the Nanning Symphony in a three concerto evening with student soloists from Shanghai, Nanning and, Juilliard.

He is currently composing a new evening length cross-cultural ballet, "Focus of the Heart" for the Chinese people with an original story written by his partner Howard Kessler. The score utilizes both full Traditional Chinese and Western orchestras.  It was scheduled to be premiered Fall 2009 in Beijing.

Since 2003 Dr. Thomas has lectured, taught, and performed in Korea at a music festival that he co-directed. This festival, The Seoul Music Festival and Academy brings together Western and Korean teachers to perform and to teach advanced String and Piano students.  He conducted two programs with the Prime Symphony Orchestra, and one with  the Suwon Philharmonic, then another program for the Korean Symphony Orchestra, including his concerto for marimba and orchestra, Loving Mad Tom,  all in Seoul, Korea.

On October 9, 2004, Dr. Andrew Thomas gave a piano recital in the Juilliard Theater at the Juilliard School celebrating his 65th birthday, 35 years teaching at the Juilliard School and ten years as its Pre-College director. After twelve years he stepped down from his administrative position in 2006 to concentrate on his composition works, to teach and to foster the musical talents of young international "Citizens of the World". At his farewell party Juilliard bestowed upon him the title of director emeritus.

Works
Loving Mad Tom, a concerto for marimba and orchestra, commissioned by William Moersch,
Merlin for solo marimba, commissioned by William Moersch,
Three Transformations for duo marimbas, commissioned by Nancy Zeltsman,
Consonanze Stravaganti commissioned by American Brass Quintet,
The Heroic Triad, concerto for guitar, percussion, and string orchestra composed for Twentieth Century Unlimited
Wind for solo Marimba, composed for Makoto Nakura,
For the class of 2003 composed for Renée Fleming,
Valse Triste, a solo marimba work for Simon Boyar,
Crane by the River Li for the Traditional Chinese Instrument Orchestra of the Guangxi Arts College in Nanning, China,
A Samba for two solo flutes, two flute choirs, and chamber orchestra,
Music at Twilight for solo piano,
Three Scenes from the Summer Palace.

Dr. Thomas has also orchestrated his music for lyricist, Gene Scheer‘s Lean Away and ‘I Just Found Another New Voice Teacher‘ for  a Metropolitan Opera performance of Die Fledermaus.

Reviews
After Vladimir Ashkenazy conducted The Deutsches Symphonie-Orchester Berlin in Dr. Thomas's marimba concerto, Loving Mad Tom with Evelyn Glennie as the soloist, Jürgen Otten of Der Tagespiel wrote "... his arsenal of romantic ghost music from Weber to Berlioz to Liszt is recognized here, and sound-consciously conveyed into the modern idiom."

References

External links
American Composers Alliance
Andrew Thomas Papers at the University of Maryland Libraries

1939 births
Living people
American male composers
21st-century American composers
Cornell University alumni
Juilliard School alumni
Juilliard School faculty
21st-century American male musicians